The EA 53, (full name Esposizione internazionale dell'agricoltura di Roma 1953) was held in Rome, Italy, from 26 July to 31 October 1953. The Expo focused on modern agricultural innovations and was recognised by the Bureau International des Expositions as a Specialised Expo. The Palazzo della Civiltà Italiana, located in the Esposizione Universale Roma EUR district of Rome was the site of the Expo, which welcomed 1,700,000 visitors.

References

External links
BIE official website

World's fairs in Rome
1953 in Italy
1950s in Rome